Compo is a 1989 low budget Australian film.

Buesst made it while running the St Kilda Film Festival.

Premise
A man goes to work for the state compensation office.

Cast
Jeremy Stanford as Paul Harper
Bruce Kerr as David Bartlett
Christopher Barry as Carlo Garbanzo
Elisabeth Crockett as Gina
Cliff Neate as Dale Bradley
Leo Regan as Eddie

Reception
The Tribune said the film "was mostly funny, but a little too long. Although it's a
parody of the worst aspects of the public service, the portrayal of people with injuries as leeches on society did get a little annoying. Nonetheless, for a small budget, home-grown movie Nigel Buesst has done very well."

The Age said it "had a smattering of excellent on liners but is a narrative and satirical shambles and is further sullied by some dreadful miscasting."

References

External links
Compo at IMDb
Compo at TCMDB

Australian comedy films
1980s English-language films
1989 comedy films
Films directed by Nigel Buesst
1980s Australian films